The Mamoor Mosque is a mosque in Chennai, Tamil Nadu, India. It is located in Muthialpet.

History 
The mosque was first built in the 18th century. It was rebuilt in granite by the Nawab of Carnatic in the late 19th century. Since then, the mosque has been frequently renovated.

References 

 

Mosques in Chennai